Tony Kaye (born 8 July 1952) is an English director of films, music videos, advertisements, and documentaries. He is best known as the director of American History X (1998).

Life and career 
Kaye was born to an Haredi Jewish family in Stamford Hill, London, United Kingdom.  

He made his name as a director of television commercials with award-winning spots for British Rail InterCity ("Relax", 1988) and the Solid Fuel Advisory Council ("Furry Friends", 1988), as well as his 1993 advertisement for Dunlop Tyres ("Tested for the Unexpected") set to the sound of Venus in Furs by the Velvet Underground.  By 1996 he had won 23 British Design and Art Direction (D&AD) awards, and in 2012 was jointly named "most awarded director" (co-equal with Frank Budgen) at the organisation's 50th anniversary.
 
Kaye has also made several well-known music videos, including the video for "God's Gonna Cut You Down" by Johnny Cash, which won a Grammy Award, "Dani California" by Red Hot Chili Peppers, "What God Wants" by Roger Waters, and "Help Me" and "Runaway Train" by Soul Asylum. Kaye is a nine-time Grammy nominated music video director.

His feature film debut was American History X (1998), a drama about racism starring Edward Norton and Edward Furlong. Kaye disowned the final cut of the film and unsuccessfully attempted to have his name removed from the credits. The film was critically lauded and Norton was nominated for the Academy Award for Best Actor for his performance in the film. The battle over artistic control of the film, which has become part of Hollywood folklore, all but destroyed Kaye's career. He delivered his original cut on time and within budget – but when the producer, New Line Cinema, insisted on changes, the arguments began. The debate quickly escalated. Kaye spent $100,000 of his own money to take out 35 full-page ads in the Hollywood trade press denouncing Norton and the producer, using quotations from a variety of people from John Lennon to Abraham Lincoln. He attended a meeting at New Line to which (to ease negotiations) he brought a Catholic priest, a Jewish rabbi and a Tibetan monk. When the company offered him an additional eight weeks to re-cut the film, he said he had discovered a new vision and needed a year to remake it, and flew to the Caribbean to have the script rewritten by the Nobel Prize-winning poet Derek Walcott. Finally, when the Directors Guild refused to let him remove his name from the New Line version of the film, he demanded it to be credited to "Humpty Dumpty" instead, and filed a $200 million lawsuit when the company refused.

Kaye's second feature, a documentary called Lake of Fire, was about the abortion debate in the United States. It opened in Toronto in September 2006. The movie was shortlisted for the Academy Award for Best Documentary Feature (though it did not win a nomination), and was nominated for Best Documentary Film at the Independent Spirit Awards, the Chicago Film Critics Association Awards, and the Satellite Awards. Lake of Fire took Kaye 18 years to make.

Kaye's third feature film was a crime drama titled Black Water Transit starring Laurence Fishburne, Karl Urban, Evan Ross, Brittany Snow, and Stephen Dorff. The film was shot in New Orleans during the summer of 2007. A rough cut was reportedly screened at the 2009 Cannes Film Festival but the film was never released to cinemas.  the film is considered unfinished due to the production company's bankruptcy and the ensuing litigation.

Kaye's fourth feature film, Detachment (2011), starring Adrien Brody, as well as featuring Kaye's daughter Betty, is a drama about teachers. It centers on Brody as a struggling substitute teacher in a failing New York public school. It premiered in April 2011 at the Tribeca Film Festival. The film screened and won awards at the following film festivals: Deauville American Film Festival, Woodstock film festival (Honorary Maverick Award for Kaye) Valenciennes International Festival of Action and Adventure Films in France, Tokyo International Film Festival, São Paulo International Film Festival, and Ramdam Film Festival in Tournai, Belgium. 

Kaye announced in early 2016 that he was set to direct Joe Vinciguerra's screenplay titled Stranger Than the Wheel, starring Shia LaBeouf, and in 2018 he was reported to have signed on to direct Honorable Men, a crime drama written by Gary DeVore. However, neither project has since come to fruition. Since 2020, he has announced several new projects in development: African History Y starring Djimon Hounsou; Civil, a drama set amid the civil rights movement; and Tremendum, a partially animated film inspired by conversations Kaye had with Marlon Brando. He is also set to direct dark comedy film The Trainer written by Vito Schnabel and Jeff Solomon.

Personal life
Kaye has been married twice. His first wife was a Romanian woman named Eugenia Volosinovici. They have two daughters. His second wife is Chinese-American artist Yan Lin Kaye. They have two daughters: Shanghai and Eema Emet Kaye.

Kaye enjoys singing, songwriting and playing guitar. He is frequently found at various open mic nights around London, most notably Redrock Jam at Dublin Castle, Camden and Ant Henson's Open Mic London in Clerkenwell.

Filmography

As director
 American History X (1998)
 Lake of Fire (2006) (documentary film)
 Black Water Transit (2009; unreleased)
 Detachment (2011)

As actor
 Spun (2002) (cameo)

References

External links 
 
 Telegraph.co.uk's Revealing Interview
 Tony Kaye interview, at The A.V. Club
 Tony Kaye's This Is Not Sex, starring Elizabeth Banks and Seth Rogen
 Video Interview for DP/30: The Oral History of Hollywood, March 2012.  via YouTube.

1952 births
Living people
English Jews
Film directors from London
Advertising directors
British music video directors
Grammy Award winners